Salthill is a seaside area in the City of Galway in the west of Ireland. Lying within the townland of Lenaboy (an Léana Buí), it attracts many tourists all year round. There is a 2 km long promenade, locally known as the Prom, overlooking Galway Bay with bars, restaurants and hotels.

Tourism and events
thumb|right|262px|Leisureland

Salthill was, until 2007, home to one of the biggest non-fee paying air shows in Galway, the Salthill Air Show, which took place in June over Galway Bay. The show annually attracted over 100,000 people and generated over €1m in revenue.

The 1970s saw the introduction of a number of casinos and more leisure centres.

Salthill was a centre point for the 2008–09 Volvo Ocean Race, as well as the Round-Ireland Powerboat race in 2010.

Every Christmas Day for many years it has been a tradition to jump into the sea from Blackrock Diving Tower. This record-breaking event is now a fundraiser for local charity in Galway.

Sport
Salthill-Knocknacarra (SKGAA) is the local Gaelic Athletic Association club and is the largest in the West of Ireland catering for Football, Ladies Football, Hurling, Camogie and G4MO.  The senior men’s team won the All-Ireland Senior Club Football Championship in 2006, beating St. Gall's in the final and the 2022 Ladies Junior Football title. Pearse Stadium, one of Galway GAA's two primary stadiums (the other being St Jarlath's Park), is on Dr Mannix Road in Salthill. The club boasts an impressive array of infrastructure including grass and 4G pitches at the prairie adjacent to its club HQ at Arus Bóthar na Trá which is a community focal point for social, sporting and community based activities as well as meeting and conference facilities. The clubs ethos of Four Codes, One Club, One Community is indicative of its commitment to providing a firm sense of responsibility to the local community and a valuable resource for children and adults.

Salthill Devon F.C., the local football team, fields teams in the Galway & District League. They played in the League of Ireland First Division from 2010 to 2013, before merging with Mervue United and GUST, the supporters trust of the then defunct Galway United, to form Galway F.C.

The Galway Lawn Tennis Club, winner of Irish Tennis Club of the Year in 2002, is located on Threadneedle Road.

Transport
Salthill railway station opened on 1 October 1879 and closed for passenger traffic in January 1918.

As of 2022, there is one city bus service, Bus Éireann route 401, which runs to from Salthill to Eyre Square. Bus Éireann also runs the regional bus routes 416 and 424 from Galway's bus station to Connemara, which pass via Salthill.

Popular culture
The Long Walk and the Salthill promenade are both referenced in the Steve Earle penned tune "Galway Girl".

See also
 List of towns and villages in Ireland
 Wild Atlantic Way

References

 
Articles on towns and villages in Ireland possibly missing Irish place names
Beaches of County Galway
Geography of Galway (city)
Seaside resorts in the Republic of Ireland
Tourist attractions in Galway (city)